BNS Shaheed Ruhul Amin was an  offshore patrol vessel of the Bangladesh Navy used as a training ship. She was built and served as a Royal Navy Island-class patrol vessel HMS Jersey (P295) from 1977 to 1993.

History

British service
 was built at Aberdeen, being launched in 1976 by Princess Anne and subsequently commissioned into the Royal Navy later that year. She was the first ship of the class to be commissioned; six more followed her.

As part of the Fishery Protection Squadron, along with her sister ships, Jersey patrolled the waters around the UK (sometimes also Gibraltar) providing protection for Britain's fishing grounds, as well as providing oil and gas platform protection.
In 1993 she became involved in the Cherbourg incident, when Jersey captured the French trawler La Calypso in the Channel Islands waters on 2 April 1993.

She was decommissioned in 1993. All of the Island class were decommissioned by January 2004, being replaced by the modern s.

Bangladeshi service
The Bangladeshis purchased the ship as a training craft in 1993. She was commissioned in the Bangladesh Navy under the name Shaheed Ruhul Amin, in honour of naval hero Mohammad Ruhul Amin, on 29 January 1994. She was based at Chittagong. Ultimately all but one of her sister ships were transferred to Bangladesh as patrol craft. On 16 June 2020, she was decommissioned from the Bangladesh Navy.

See also
 List of historic ships of the Bangladesh Navy

References

Bibliography

Shaheed Ruhul Amin
Ships of the Fishery Protection Squadron of the United Kingdom
1976 ships
Ships built by Hall, Russell & Company